Loh Gwo Burne (born 26 February 1974) is a Malaysian politician. He was the member of the Malaysian Parliament for Kelana Jaya, Selangor for one term from 2008 to 2013. He set in Parliament as a member of the People's Justice Party (PKR) in the Pakatan Rakyat (PR) opposition coalition then.

Loh first gained fame when a video that he shot lead to a Royal Commission of Inquiry into the manipulation of judicial appointments. In the 2008 election, he was named by Keadilan to contest the seat of Kelana Jaya, and subsequently defeated Barisan Nasional candidate Lee Hwa Beng and independent Billi Lim Peng Soon.

Loh attended primary school at Sam Teck and secondary school at Poi Lam as well as ACS in Singapore. He has a degree in law from London and a master in law from China.

Election results

References

1974 births
Living people
People from London
Malaysian politicians of Chinese descent
People's Justice Party (Malaysia) politicians
Members of the Dewan Rakyat
Anglo-Chinese School alumni
Alumni of the University of Hull
China University of Political Science and Law alumni